The Slovenian Air Force has gone under different names in different periods:

 15th Aviation Brigade of the Territorial Defense Force, from 1992 to 1995
 15th Aviation Brigade of the Slovenian Army, from 1995 to 2008
 Brigade of air defense and aviation of the Slovenian Army, from 2008 to present